Samridh Sunil "Sam" Agarwal (born 13 July 1990) is an Indian cricketer who played for Oxford University and the associated Oxford MCCU. Born in Agra, Uttar Pradesh, India, he was educated at the all-boys Indian boarding school The Doon School in Dehradun before transferring to Millfield in Street, Somerset in England. 
He made his debut in first-class cricket in 2010. He bats right handed and bowls right arm offbreaks. In the opening round of first-class fixtures in 2013, he took 3-26 and scored 108 against the county champions, Warwickshire County Cricket Club. In the four-day varsity match at Cambridge during the 2013 season, Agarwal scored 313 not out from 312 balls, becoming the first player to record a triple century in inter-university matches, and breaking the record for the highest score by an Oxford player at first-class level.

He played a number of games for the Surrey 2nd XI following his stint at Oxford but was not contracted to the county. He was unable to continue playing in England or be contracted by Surrey as he did not qualify as per ECB rules to play for a county as a domestic player in the English county matches. Sam Agarwal has returned to India and is currently training at the RP Cricket Academy in New Delhi.

References

External links 
 
 

1990 births
Living people
Indian cricketers
Indian expatriates in the United Kingdom
Oxford University cricketers
People educated at Millfield
Sportspeople from Agra
Alumni of The Queen's College, Oxford
The Doon School alumni
Oxford MCCU cricketers